The Six Nations Championship (known as the Guinness Six Nations for sponsorship reasons) is an annual international men's rugby union competition between the teams of England, France, Ireland, Italy, Scotland and Wales. The current champions are Ireland, who won the 2023 tournament.

The tournament is organised by the unions of the six participating nations under the banner of Six Nations Rugby, which is responsible for the promotion and operation of the men's, women's and under-20s tournaments, and the Autumn International Series, as well as the negotiation and management of their centralised commercial rights.

The Six Nations is the successor to the Home Nations Championship (1883–1909 and 1932–39), played between teams from England, Ireland, Scotland, and Wales, which was the first international rugby union tournament. With the addition of France, this became the Five Nations Championship (1910–31 and 1947–99), which in turn became the Six Nations Championship with the addition of Italy in 2000.

Wales have won the championship the most times, with 40 titles (28 outright, 12 shared), but England have won the most outright titles with 29. Since the Six Nations era started in 2000, only Italy and Scotland have failed to win the Six Nations title.

The women's tournament started as the Women's Home Nations in the 1996 season.

History and expansion
The tournament was first played in 1883 as the Home Nations Championship among the then four Home Nations of the United Kingdom – England, Ireland, Scotland, and Wales. However, England was excluded from the 1888 and 1889 tournaments due to their refusal to join the International Rugby Football Board. The tournament then became the Five Nations Championship in 1910 with the addition of France. The tournament was expanded in 2000 to become the Six Nations Championship with the addition of Italy.

Following the relative success of the Tier 2 nations in the 2015 Rugby World Cup, there were calls by Octavian Morariu, the president of Rugby Europe, to let Georgia and Romania join the Six Nations due to their consistent success in the European Nations Cup and ability to compete in the Rugby World Cup.

Format 

The tournament begins on the first weekend in February and culminates on the second or third Saturday in March. Each team plays every other team once (a total of 15 matches), with home ground advantage alternating from one year to the next. Before the 2017 tournament, two points were awarded for a win, one for a draw and none for a loss. Unlike many other rugby union competitions, a bonus point system had not previously been used.

A bonus point system was first used in the 2017 Championship. The system is similar to the one used in most rugby championships (0 points for a loss, 2 for a draw, 4 for a win, 1 for scoring four or more tries in a match, and 1 for losing by 7 points or fewer). The only difference is that a team that wins all their games (a Grand Slam) are automatically awarded 3 extra points - to ensure they cannot be overtaken by a defeated team on bonus points.

Before 1994, teams equal on match points shared the championship. Since then, ties have been broken by considering the points difference (total points scored minus total points conceded) of the teams. The rules of the championship further provide that if teams tie on both match points and points difference, the team that scored the most tries wins the championship. Were this decider to be a tie, the tying teams would share the championship. To date, however, match points and points difference have been sufficient to decide the championship.

The Wooden Spoon is a metaphorical award given to the team that finishes in last place, or alternatively by a team that loses all of its games in a championship. Since the inaugural Six Nations tournament in 2000, only England and Ireland have avoided finishing last. Italy have finished last 18 times in the Six Nations era, and have lost every match 13 times.

Trophies

Championship Trophy 

The winners of the Six Nations are presented with the Championship Trophy. This was originally conceived by the Earl of Westmorland, and was first presented to the winners of the 1993 championship, France. It is a sterling silver trophy, designed by James Brent-Ward and made by a team of eight silversmiths from the London firm William Comyns.

It has 15 side panels representing the 15 members of the team and with three handles to represent the three officials (referee and two touch judges). The cup has a capacity of 3.75 litres – sufficient for five bottles of champagne. Within the mahogany base is a concealed drawer which contains six alternative finials, each a silver replica of one of the team emblems, which can be screwed on the detachable lid.

A new trophy was introduced for the 2015 Championship.	
The new trophy was designed and crafted by Thomas Lyte silversmiths and replaces the 1993 edition, which is being retired as it represented the nations that took part in the Five Nations Championship. Ireland were the last team to win the old trophy and the first team to win the new one.

Grand Slam and Triple Crown 
A team that wins all its games wins the 'Grand Slam'.

The Triple Crown may only be won by one of the Home Nations of England, Ireland, Scotland or Wales, when one nation wins all three of their matches against the others. The Triple Crown dates back to the original Home Nations Championship, but the physical Triple Crown Trophy has been awarded only since 2006, when the Royal Bank of Scotland (the primary sponsor of the competition) commissioned Hamilton & Inches to design and create a dedicated Triple Crown Trophy. It has since been won four times by Ireland and Wales, and three times by England.

Rivalry trophies 
Several individual competitions take place under the umbrella of the tournament. Some of these trophies are also awarded for other matches between the two teams outside the Six Nations.

Venues 

As of the 2021 competition, Six Nations matches are held in the following stadiums:

The opening of Aviva Stadium in May 2010 ended the arrangement with the Gaelic Athletic Association (GAA) that allowed the all-Ireland governing body for rugby union, the Irish Rugby Football Union, to use the GAA's flagship stadium, Croke Park, for its international matches. This arrangement was made necessary by the 2007 closure and subsequent demolition of Ireland's traditional home at Lansdowne Road; Aviva Stadium was built on the former Lansdowne Road site. During this construction, Croke Park was the largest of the Six Nations grounds, with a capacity of 82,300.

In 2012 Italy moved their home games from the 32,000 seat Stadio Flaminio, to Stadio Olimpico, also in Rome, with a capacity of 72,000.

The French Rugby Federation (FFR) had planned to build a new stadium of its own, seating 82,000 in the southern suburbs of Paris, because of frustrations with their tenancy of Stade de France. However the project was cancelled in December 2016. France played their 2018 match against Italy at Stade Vélodrome in Marseille.

In 2020, Wales played their final game at Parc y Scarlets in Llanelli due to the Millennium Stadium being used as Dragon's Heart Hospital in response to the COVID-19 pandemic.

Results

Overall

Home Nations (1883–1909)

Five Nations (1910–1931)

Home Nations (1932–1939)

Five Nations (1940–1999)

Six Nations (2000–present)

Titles and awards

Wooden Spoon

Six Nations

Bold indicates that the team did not win any matches.

Player awards

Records 

Ireland's Johnny Sexton holds the record for most points in the competition, with 566. England's Jonny Wilkinson holds the records for individual points in one match (35 points against Italy in 2001) and one season with 89 (scored in 2001).

The record for tries in a match is held by Scotsman George Campbell Lindsay who scored five tries against Wales in 1887. England's Cyril Lowe and Scotland's Ian Smith jointly hold the record for tries in one season with 8 (Lowe in 1914, Smith in 1925). Ireland's Brian O'Driscoll has the Championship record for tries with 26.

The record for appearances is held by Sergio Parisse of Italy, with 69 appearances, since his Six Nations debut in 2004.

The most points scored by a team in one match was 80 points, scored by England against Italy in 2001. England also scored the most ever points in a season in 2001 with 229, and most tries in a season with 29. Wales hold the record for fewest tries conceded during a season in the Six Nations era, conceding only 2 in 5 games in 2008, but the 1977 Grand Slam-winning France team did not concede a try in their four matches. Wales hold the record for the longest time without conceding a try, at 358 minutes in the 2013 tournament.

Administration 
The Championship is run from headquarters in Dublin, Ireland by Six Nations Rugby Ltd. Benjamin Morel became the CEO of the Six Nations Championship as of 5 November 2018, replacing John Feehan, who stepped down on 20 April 2018.

Media 
The BBC has long covered the tournament in the United Kingdom, broadcasting all matches apart from England home matches between 1997 and 2002, which were shown live by Sky Sports with highlights on the BBC. In addition, Welsh language coverage of broadcasts matches featuring the Welsh team shown by the BBC are shown on S4C in Wales in the United Kingdom. Between 2003 and 2015, the BBC covered every match live on BBC Sport either on BBC One or BBC Two with highlights also on the BBC Sport website and either on the BBC Red Button or late at night on BBC Two. In 2011, it was announced that the BBC's coverage of the tournament on TV, radio and online would be extended to 2017.

On 9 July 2015, in reaction to bids by Sky for the rights beginning in 2018, the BBC ended its contract two seasons early, and renegotiated a joint contract with ITV Sport for rights to the Six Nations from 2016 through 2021. ITV acquired rights to England, Ireland and Italy home matches, while the BBC retained rights to France, Scotland and Wales home matches. By ending its contract early, the BBC saved around £30 million, while the new contract generated £20 million in additional revenue for the Six Nations.

With the end of the contract nearing, speculation once again emerged in 2020 that Sky was pursuing rights to the Six Nations from 2022 onward; under the Ofcom "listed events" rules, rights to the tournament can be held by a pay television channel if delayed broadcasts or highlights are made available on free-to-air television. It was reported that the bid for CVC Equity Partners to purchase a stake in the Six Nations was being hindered by a desire for a more lucrative broadcast contract; a call for the Six Nations to be moved to Category A (which requires live coverage to air free-to-air) was rejected. In May 2021, the BBC and ITV renewed their contracts through 2025. The BBC will continue to broadcast home matches from Scotland and Wales and all women's and under-20s matches, with ITV airing England, France, Ireland and Italy home matches.

In Ireland, RTÉ have broadcast the championship since RTÉ's inception and continued to do so until 2017, while TG4 televised highlights. However, in late 2015 RTÉ's free-to-air rival TV3 was awarded the rights for every game from the Six Nations on Irish television from 2018 to 2021. In 2022 it was announced that RTÉ and Virgin Media would share broadcasting rights.

France Télévisions covered the competition in France.

In Italy, from 2022 TV8 and Sky Italia broadcast all matches.

In the United States, NBC Sports broadcasts matches in English and TV5 Monde airs matches in French.

Sponsorship
Until 1998, the Championship had no title sponsor. Sponsorship rights were sold to Lloyds TSB Group for the 1999 tournament and the competition was titled the Lloyds TSB 5 Nations and Lloyds TSB 6 Nations until 2002.

The Royal Bank of Scotland Group took over sponsorship from 2003 until 2017, with the competition being branded the RBS 6 Nations. A new title sponsor was sought for the 2018 tournament and beyond. However, after struggling to find a new sponsor, organisers agreed a one-year extension at a reduced rate. As the RBS brand was being phased out, the tournament was named after the NatWest banking subsidiary, becoming the NatWest 6 Nations.

On 7 December 2018, Guinness was announced as the Championship's new title sponsor, with the competition to be named the Guinness Six Nations from 2019 to 2024. Due to the Loi Évin laws which prohibit alcohol sponsorship in sport, "Guinness" cannot be used as part of the branding of the tournament in France. The French-language logo for the tournament replaces the Guinness logo with the word "Greatness" in the same color and typeface as the Guinness wordmark.

See also 

The Rugby Championship, an analogous tournament of national teams in the Southern Hemisphere
Rugby Europe International Championships, for second- and third-tier national teams in Europe
Six Nations Under 20s Championship
Women's Six Nations Championship
British Home Championship, a similar tournament in association football

References

Sources

External links 

 Official website

 
1883 establishments in Europe
Rugby union competitions in Europe for national teams
Recurring sporting events established in 1883
International rugby union competitions hosted by England
International rugby union competitions hosted by France
International rugby union competitions hosted by Ireland
International rugby union competitions hosted by Scotland
International rugby union competitions hosted by Wales
International rugby union competitions hosted by Italy
England national rugby union team
France national rugby union team
Ireland national rugby union team
Scotland national rugby union team
Wales national rugby union team
Italy national rugby union team